Ty Marquise Johnson (born September 17, 1997) is an American football running back who is a free agent. He played college football at Maryland.

High school career
Johnson grew up in Cumberland, Maryland, and is a member of the graduating class of 2015 at Fort Hill High School. Johnson was a multi-year starter at both running back and defensive back for the high school football team. In his junior and senior seasons at Fort Hill in 2013 and 2014, Johnson lead the Sentinels to back to back Maryland 1A State Football Championships. After both seasons, Johnson was named Area High School Football Player of the Year by the Cumberland Times-News, and in 2014 was named to the Maryland High School Consensus All-State team by the Maryland High School Football Foundation. Johnson was responsible for nearly 5,000 all-purpose yards and 65 touchdowns during his two full varsity seasons.

College career
Johnson was rated as a three-star college prospect, the 20th best recruit in the state of Maryland, and the 64th best running back prospect in the country by Rivals. Johnson verbally committed to the Maryland Terrapins briefly after being offered a scholarship in June 2014 by then-head coach Randy Edsall at a football camp at Maryland Stadium. Johnson officially signed his letter of intent to attend Maryland in February 2015. While Johnson was recruited by other programs, he did not receive a scholarship offer from a Football Bowl Subdivision (FBS) program other than the Terrapins.

In four seasons with the Terrapins, Johnson tallied 4,196 all-purpose yards, third in program history. In his sophomore season in 2016, Johnson set the Terrapins’ single season yards per carry record, averaging 9.1 yards per rushing attempt. Johnson also starred as a kick returner, finishing his collegiate career with 1,194 kick return yards and two return touchdowns, one going for 100 yards against Ohio State in 2017, and another going for 98 yards against Michigan in 2018. Johnson graduated from Maryland in December 2018.

Professional career

Johnson did not receive an invitation to the 2019 NFL Scouting Combine. However, at Maryland's football pro day, scouts from 29 NFL teams, plus scouts from two Arena Football League teams, one team each from the Austrian Football League, German Football League and one Canadian Football League team were present to observe the workouts of 15 Maryland players, including Johnson. Johnson impressed scouts by running a 40-yard dash time clocked by most scouts as anywhere between 4.3 and 4.4 seconds, with one scout reportedly timing Johnson as fast as 4.26 seconds. For comparison, the fastest 40-yard dash time ran by any running back at the 2019 NFL Scouting Combine was 4.40 seconds by Justice Hill of the Oklahoma State Cowboys. At his pro day workout, Johnson was also able to do 27 repetitions of the bench press at 225 pounds, which would have ranked the highest among 2019 Combine running backs, and was recorded jumping a 34-inch vertical.

Detroit Lions
Johnson was drafted by the Detroit Lions in the sixth round (186th overall) of the 2019 NFL Draft. Johnson made his NFL debut in the Lions' regular season opener against the Arizona Cardinals and had a six-yard carry in the 27–27 tie. Johnson made his first career start in Week 10 against the Chicago Bears and had five carries for 16 rushing yards. Overall, in his rookie season, Johnson had 63 carries for 273 rushing yards and 24 receptions for 109 receiving yards.

On October 1, 2020, Johnson was waived by the Lions.

New York Jets
On October 2, 2020, Johnson was claimed off waivers by the New York Jets.

In Week 13 against the Las Vegas Raiders, Johnson rushed 22 times for 104 yards and a touchdown during the 31–28 loss.  Two weeks later, the Jets secured their first win on the season against the Los Angeles Rams. Johnson rushed for 16 yards on three carries, added six receptions for 39 yards, and scored the Jets' first touchdown on an 18-yard completion from quarterback Sam Darnold.

References

External links
New York Jets bio
Detroit Lions bio
Maryland Terrapins bio

1997 births
Living people
American football running backs
Detroit Lions players
Maryland Terrapins football players
New York Jets players
Players of American football from Maryland
Sportspeople from Cumberland, Maryland